The 2003 season was the New York Giants' 79th season in the National Football League (NFL) and their seventh and final under head coach Jim Fassel. The team failed to duplicate their 2002 season's playoff appearance, instead only winning four games and missing the playoffs for the first time since 2001, finishing the season on an eight-game losing streak. Jim Fassel was fired after the 2003 season and was replaced by Tom Coughlin in 2004.

Offseason

NFL Draft

Undrafted free agents

Roster

Schedule

Standings

See also
List of New York Giants seasons

References

New York Giants seasons
New York Giants
New York Giants season
21st century in East Rutherford, New Jersey
Meadowlands Sports Complex